Kunen may refer to:
Kenneth Kunen, American mathematician
former name of Acharkut, Armenia